Draw! is a 1984 American Western comedy film directed by Steven Hilliard Stern. It stars Kirk Douglas, James Coburn and Alexandra Bastedo.

Plot
In the final days of the Old West, a former desperado, Harry Holland (Kirk Douglas), only wants to leave Bell City with money he won fairly at a poker game. However, his way is barred by Reggie Bell (Derek McGrath), a gambler who lost most of the money, the sheriff and a deputy, Wally Blodgett (Graham Jarvis). In the subsequent shoot-out, the sheriff is killed and Holland and Bell are wounded. Holland takes refuge in a hotel along with a 'hostage' - Bess, (Alexandra Bastedo). The townsfolk decide the only thing to do is hire an ex-sheriff, Sam Starret (James Coburn), to 'face down' Holland. But he is now a drunk - can he beat his long-time nemesis?

Cast
Kirk Douglas - Harry H. Holland
James Coburn - Sam Starret
Alexandra Bastedo - Bess     
Graham Jarvis - Wally Blodgett
Derek McGrath - Reggie Bell
Jason Michas - Moses
Len Birman - Ephraim
Maurice Brand - Mr. Gibson
Graham McPherson - Eugene Lippert
Linda Sorenson - Teresa
Gerard Parkes - Circuit Judge Fawcett
Richard Donat - Sheriff Harmon
Frank Adamson - Lenny
Stuart Gillard - Doctor West
Larry Musser - Townsman
Frank C. Turner - Poker Player
Brian George - Bandido

Recognition
 Linda Sorenson won a Genie Award for Best Performance by an Actress in a Supporting Role
 Nominated for Genie Awards for Best Achievement in Art Direction, Best Achievement in Cinematography, Best Achievement in Overall Sound, Best Achievement in Sound Editing

External links
 
 

1984 television films
1984 films
American comedy television films
Bryna Productions films
Films directed by Steven Hilliard Stern
Films shot in Edmonton
American Western (genre) comedy films
Canadian comedy television films
1980s Western (genre) comedy films
Films with screenplays by Stanley Mann
English-language Canadian films
1980s American films
1980s Canadian films